Sezill Volcano is a lava dome in Mount Edziza Provincial Park of northern British Columbia, Canada. It is thought to have formed and last erupted during the Miocene period. The volcano gets its name from being adjacent to Sezill Creek.

See also
List of volcanoes in Canada
List of Northern Cordilleran volcanoes
Mount Edziza volcanic complex
Volcanism of Canada
Volcanism of Western Canada

References

Mount Edziza volcanic complex
Miocene lava domes